

KLM Flight 607-E was an international scheduled flight that crashed on 14 August 1958, on takeoff from Shannon Airport, Ireland.  The aircraft was a Lockheed Super Constellation.  All 99 on board died, making the crash the deadliest civil aviation disaster involving a single aircraft at the time, and the deadliest crash involving the Lockheed Constellation series, until the disappearance of Flying Tiger Line Flight 739 in 1962.

Accident
The "E" in the flight number stood for the designation of being an extra economy class flight to match the increased seasonal tourist demand.

All ninety-one passengers and eight crew died in the accident, including six members of the Egyptian fencing team (Osman Abdel Hafeez, Mohamed Ali Riad, Ahmed Sabry, et al.).

Flight 607-E departed Shannon at 03:05 UTC on the second leg of a transatlantic trip from Amsterdam, Netherlands to New York City, USA with intermediate stops in Shannon and Gander, Newfoundland. The remains of thirty-four of those on board were also recovered.

Due to the lack of evidence, Irish and Dutch investigators could not pinpoint a probable cause for the accident. They examined the possibility of a bomb, electrical failure, or pilot error, but believed that the most likely possibility was a catastrophic mechanical failure. The investigating board believed the most likely cause of the accident to be a malfunctioning over-speeding outboard propeller caused by metal particles obstructing oil feed line regulator valves.  The particles may have been formed by a gear that was damaged when the supercharger of the corresponding engine was accelerated (gear ratio shifted).  The malfunctions of the propeller pitch might have provoked a flight disturbance and as a consequence the propeller may have sheared off.

Memorial
A memorial to the people who died when KLM Flight 607-E crashed into the sea is located in Bohermore Cemetery, Galway, just inside the main gates. Several bodies of the passengers are buried around the memorial.

See also
Aviation safety
List of accidents and incidents involving commercial aircraft
List of accidents involving sports teams

References

External links

Galway Ceremony marks KLM air disaster at RTÉ News

Airliner accidents and incidents caused by mechanical failure
607-E
Accidents and incidents involving the Lockheed Constellation
Aviation accidents and incidents in the Atlantic Ocean
1958 in Ireland
Aviation accidents and incidents in 1958
August 1958 events in North America